The Myth is a rock band from Malta. Band members are: Dion Farrell on guitars and vocals, Mark Galea on drums, Patrick Mifsud on bass, Stephen Zammit on keyboards, and Claudio Sciberras on guitars.

The band supported a string of international acts such as the United Kingdom's official Eagles Tribute band in 1996, Status Quo in 1998, Smokie in 1999, and Queen Tribute Band Rhapsody UK in 2009.

History

Formation and early days (1990–1996) 

Dion Farrell and Mark Galea formed The Myth in September 1990. The band's first live appearance was two months later, during which they performed two songs, both of which were cover versions.

Their early style is described by some as 'bridging American melodic rock with the more classic European influences' (The Times, November 1996). Such tracks include Master Of Death, The Anthem and the self-titled The Myth.  These songs featured long guitar solos up to three minutes long, with powerful drumming and melodic bass lines. During this period the band released two singles, Can't Stop The Fire and Midnight.  Although both singles were aired on radio stations and played on TV channels, they were not available for sale to the general public.

Second generation (1996–2005) 

The Myth began experimenting with a completely different sound. Panpipes and tambourines replaced the long guitar solos, and the songs became quieter and more acoustic in nature. Wise Men and The Truth are just two of such songs.

Third generation (2005–2011) 

Known as the Brit Pop era. In early 2005, The Myth ventured into the commercial scene. Although written in 1996, Sworn Independent was finally recorded in 2007 and was released as a single in the same year.  The success of the track led to more radio-friendly tracks such as Star and Animal being written. Animal was the band's first single to have an official music video.

Following further radio hits such as How Does It Feel? and Dreams, in August 2009 the band was chosen as a supporting act for Rhapsody UK, UK's Official Queen Tribute Band.

On 8 August 2011 The Myth released its first album.  Dreams, as this new album was called, was a collection of all the singles that the band released. In November of the same year the band was nominated for the Best Website Award in the Malta Music Awards.

Fourth generation (2011–present) 

Referred to as the Pop Rock era, it was obvious right from the launch of the single Sadness in your Eyes in 2012 that the band was once again playing a completely different sound. A few months later this single was followed up by a dance remix version by DJ/Producer DJ Toby. Both versions of this single were featured in the movie Silhouette in 2013.

Discography

Singles 

1. Can't Stop The Fire (1991)
02. Midnight (1992)
03. Sworn Independent (2007)
04. Star (2008)
05. How Does It Feel? (2008)
06. Animal (2008)
07. Dreams (2009)
08. Thank You (2009)
09. Crazy (2010)
10. Sadness In Your Eyes (2012)
11. Sadness In Your Eyes (dance remix by DJ Toby) (2012)
12. Beautiful (2013)
13. Tonight (2020)
14. Without You (2022)

Albums 
 Dreams (2011)

Highlights 
 Supporting act for the Official Eagles Tribute Band (1996)
 Supporting act for Status Quo (1998)
 Supporting act for Smokie (1999)
 Supporting act for the Official Queen Tribute Band (2009)
 Nomination for the Best Website Award in the Malta Music Awards (2011)
 Soundtrack for feature film Silhouette (2013)

References

External links
  Official Website
  Facebook
  Twitter
  YouTube

Maltese musical groups
Musical groups established in 1990